Adrià Gallego Arias (born 9 April 1990) is a Spanish professional footballer who plays as a right back for Andorran club Inter d'Escaldes.

Club career
Born in Lleida, Catalonia, Gallego never played any higher than Segunda División B in Spain, with a season each for hometown club UE Lleida (dissolved at the end of 2010–11), Club Portugalete and Atlético Saguntino.

Politehnica Iași

In June 2018, Gallego left Saguntino and joined Romanian team FC Politehnica Iași on a free transfer. He later signed a two-year deal with the Liga I squad. On 23 July, he made his Liga I debut for Politehnica in a 0–0 draw against Universitatea Craiova. After taking a salary reduction to stay on at the cash-strapped club for one more season, he scored his only goal on 28 October 2019, to decide a 2–1 home win over CFR Cluj.

Inter Club d'Escaldes

On 5 February 2021, Gallego signed for Inter Club d'Escaldes of the Andorran Primera Divisió.

References

External links
 Player profile at bdfutbol.com
 

1990 births
Living people
Sportspeople from Lleida
Spanish footballers
Footballers from Catalonia
Association football defenders
Segunda División B players
Liga I players
Primera Divisió players
UE Lleida players
Club Portugalete players
Atlético Saguntino players
CD Binéfar players
FC Politehnica Iași (2010) players
Inter Club d'Escaldes players
Spanish expatriate footballers
Expatriate footballers in Romania
Expatriate footballers in Andorra
Spanish expatriate sportspeople in Romania
Spanish expatriate sportspeople in Andorra
FC Ascó players